Karel Antonius Lucia Maria van Miert (17 January 1942 – 22 June 2009) was a Flemish politician of the Different Socialist Party and official of the European Commission.

Biography
He was born in Oud-Turnhout. He studied at Ghent University (1962–1966) and gained a degree in diplomatic sciences. In 1976 he became adjunct-national secretary of the – at that time – unitary Belgian socialist party. Two years later he became president of the Different Socialist Party. In 1989 he was appointed European commissioner responsible for transport, credit and investment and consumer policy. In 1992 he was also put in charge of environmental policy. On 26 May 1992 he was appointed Minister of State. From 1993 till 1999 he served as vice-chairman of the European commission and was responsible for competition policy. In this period Van Miert was according to The Guardian "one of the most powerful men in Europe." In 2001, he was awarded the Vlerick Award. He also worked with Eli Lilly and Company, a global pharmaceutical corporation. After his departure from politics Van Miert was an international advisor to Goldman Sachs.

On 22 June 2009, 67-year-old Van Miert died at his home in Beersel, after falling from a garden ladder when he had a cardiac arrest.

Political curriculum
Member of the European Parliament (1979–1985)
Deputy in the Belgian Chamber (1985–1988)
European Commissioner (1989–1999)

Notes

|-

|-

|-

1942 births
2009 deaths
Accidental deaths from falls
Accidental deaths in Belgium
Belgian European Commissioners
Belgian Ministers of State
Belgian Socialist Party politicians
Belgian socialists
European Commissioners for Competition
Goldman Sachs people
Eli Lilly and Company people
Ghent University alumni
MEPs for Belgium 1979–1984
MEPs for Belgium 1984–1989
Socialistische Partij Anders MEPs
Socialistische Partij Anders politicians